Isham Talbot (1773September 25, 1837) was a United States Senator from Kentucky.

Born in Bedford County, Virginia, Isham Talbot Jr. moved with his parents, Isham and Elizabeth (Davis) Talbot,  to Harrodsburg, Kentucky in about 1784. He was admitted to the bar, and began his legal practice in Versailles, Kentucky. He moved to Frankfort, Kentucky, where he also was a lawyer.

Talbot served in the Kentucky Senate from 1812 to 1815. He was then elected as a Democratic Republican to the United States Senate to fill the vacancy caused by the resignation of Senator Jesse Bledsoe, and served from February 2, 1815 to March 3, 1819. The second time he was elected to the United States Senate was to fill the vacancy caused by the resignation of William Logan, and served from October 19, 1820 to March 3, 1825. He then resumed his law practice and died on his plantation near Frankfort.

Isham Talbot was interred in the State Cemetery in Frankfort.

References 

1773 births
1837 deaths
Burials at Frankfort Cemetery
Kentucky lawyers
Kentucky state senators
People from Bedford County, Virginia
Politicians from Frankfort, Kentucky
United States senators from Kentucky
Democratic-Republican Party United States senators
Kentucky Democratic-Republicans
19th-century American lawyers